Mekapati is an Indian family name. Notable people with the family name include:

Mekapati Rajamohan Reddy (born 1944), Indian politician
Mekapati Goutham Reddy (1971–2022), Indian politician and son of Rajamohan Reddy